Bertram Grosvenor Goodhue (April 28, 1869 – April 23, 1924) was an American architect celebrated for his work in Gothic Revival and Spanish Colonial Revival design. He also designed notable typefaces, including Cheltenham and Merrymount for the Merrymount Press. Later in life, Goodhue freed his architectural style with works like El Fureidis in Montecito, one of the three estates designed by Goodhue.

Early career 
Goodhue was born in Pomfret, Connecticut, to Charles Wells Goodhue and his second wife, Helen Grosvenor (Eldredge) Goodhue. Due to financial constraints he was educated at home by his mother until, at age 11 years, he was sent to Russell's Collegiate and Commercial Institute. Finances prevented him from attending university, but he received an honorary degree from Trinity College in Connecticut in 1911. In lieu of formal training, in 1884 he moved to Manhattan, New York City, to apprentice at the architectural firm of Renwick, Aspinwall and Russell (one of its principals, James Renwick, Jr., was the architect of Grace Church and St. Patrick's Cathedral, both in New York City). Goodhue's apprenticeship ended in 1891 when he won a design competition for St. Matthew's in Dallas.

Cram and Goodhue 
After completing his apprenticeship, Goodhue moved to Boston Massachusetts, where he was befriended by a group of young, artistic intellectuals involved in the founding of the Society of Arts and Crafts – Boston in 1897. This circle included Charles Eliot Norton of Harvard University and Ernest Fenollosa of the Boston Museum of Fine Arts. It was also through this group that Goodhue met Ralph Adams Cram, who would be his business partner for almost 25 years. Cram and Goodhue were members of several societies, including the "Pewter Mugs" and the "Visionists". In 1892–1893 they published a quarterly art magazine called The Knight Errant. The multitalented Goodhue was also a student of book design and type design. In 1896, he created the Cheltenham typeface for use by a New York printer, Cheltenham Press. This typeface came to be used as the headline type for The New York Times.

In 1891, Cram and Goodhue formed the architectural firm of Cram, Wentworth, and Goodhue, renamed Cram, Goodhue and Ferguson in 1898. The firm was a leader in Neo-Gothic architecture, with significant commissions from ecclesiastical, academic, and institutional clients. The Gothic Revival Saint Thomas Church was designed by them and built in 1914 on Manhattan's Fifth Avenue in New York City. In 1904, Goodhue built a townhouse at 106 East 74th Street, pushing the front to the building line and redesigning it in a mix of Gothic and Tudor styles. In 1915, Goodhue accepted membership to what is known now as the American Academy of Arts and Letters. In 1917, Goodhue was elected into the National Academy of Design as an Associate member, and became a full Academician in 1923.

Independent practice

Early projects 
When Goodhue left to begin his own practice in 1914, Cram had already created his dreamed of Gothic Revival commission at the Cathedral of St. John the Divine in New York City, and continued to work in the Gothic style mode for the rest of his career.

Goodhue departed into a series of radically different stylistic experiments over his independent career. His first was the Byzantine Revival style for St. Bartholomew's Episcopal Church on New York City's Park Avenue, built on a new platform just above the Grand Central Terminal railyards.

Spanish Colonial Revival projects 

In California, in 1915, Bertram Goodhue re-interpreted masterful Spanish Baroque and Spanish Colonial architecture complete with the latter's traditional Churrigueresque detailing into what became known as the Spanish Colonial Revival Style of architecture. This was for the significant commission of the El Prado Quadrangle's layout and buildings at the major 1915 Panama-California Exposition, located in San Diego's Balboa Park. He was the lead architect, taking over from Irving Gill, with Carleton Winslow Sr. and Lloyd Wright assisting. The Panama-California Exposition's style was seen by many and widely published, becoming extremely influential in California and the Southern and Southwestern United States. It led to California's assimilation of Spanish Colonial Revival Style architecture as its dominant historical regional style, which continues to this day. The singular style for the rebuilding of Santa Barbara after its 1925 destruction by a major earthquake was drawn from the local Mission Revival and Goodhue's Panama-California Exposition Spanish Colonial Revival style trends. Examples of influential private Californian commissions, both extant registered landmarks now, are his 1906 J. Waldron Gillespie Estate El Fureidis and 1915 Dater – Wright Ludington Estate Dias Felices — Val Verde in Montecito. Goodhue and Gillespie had done a six-month research and acquisitions tour together through Egypt, Persia, and the Arabian Peninsula before collaborating on the classic Persian gardens layout and Roman and Spanish Colonial Revival residence at El Fureidis. Goodhue's Spanish Colonial Revival style work went on to dominate the Hawaiian architecture of public buildings and estate residences during the 1920s building boom in the Territory of Hawaii.

Later projects 
Later Goodhue's architectural creations became freed of architectural detail and more Romanesque in form, although he remained dedicated to the integration of sculpture, mosaic work, and color in his surface architectural details. Towards the end of his career, he arrived at a highly personal style, a synthesis of simplified form and a generalized archaic quality, and those innovations paved the way for others to transition to modern architectural idioms. This style is seen in his last major projects: the 1926 Mediterranean revival and Egyptian revival Los Angeles Public Library; the Nebraska State Capitol; and in his 1922 entry for the Chicago Tribune Tower competition.

Influence 

Goodhue died in 1924 in New York City. He was interred within a wall vault in the north (left-hand) transept of his Church of the Intercession, at his request in the building he considered his finest. Architectural sculptor Lee Lawrie created a Gothic styled tomb for him there, featuring Goodhue recumbent, crowned by a carved halo of some of his buildings. He received the AIA Gold Medal in 1925.

Collaboration 
Over the course of his career, Goodhue relied on frequent collaborations with several significant artists and artisans. These included architectural sculptor Lee Lawrie, and mosaicist and muralist Hildreth Meiere. Their work is central to the aesthetic power and social messages implicit in Goodhue's best work. Lee Lawrie worked with Cram and Goodhue on: the Chapel at West Point, the Church of St. Vincent Ferrer, St. Bartholomew's, and the reredos at the Church of St. Thomas. Lawrie worked after 1914 with Goodhue's independent practice on: the Los Angeles Public Library, the Nebraska State Capitol, the Rockefeller Chapel at the University of Chicago, the National Academy of Sciences Building in Washington, D.C., and the Christ Church Cranbrook completed after Goodhue's death at the Cranbrook Schools in Bloomfield Hills, Michigan. Edward Ardolino was a frequent collaborating sculptor.

After Goodhue's unexpected death in 1924, many of his designs and projects were brought to completion by architect Carleton Winslow Sr. in California, the successor firm of Mayers Murray & Phillip in New York, and other former associates. Goodhue's offices had employed, before they established their own independent practices and reputations, designers and architects such as Raymond Hood, Carleton Winslow Sr., Clarence Stein, and Wallace Harrison. Thematic consultant Hartley Burr Alexander, Lee Lawrie, and Hildreth Meiere reassembled in the 1930s for the Rockefeller Center project collaboration with Raymond Hood.

Legacy 
In a recent dissertation on American regional architecture in California and Hawaii, Goodhue is credited with creating a distinctive interpretation of Spanish Colonial architecture into the Spanish Colonial Revival Style as a dominant Californian regional vernacular. He also directly influenced the dominance of the Spanish Colonial Revival style in major public and private architecture of 1920s Hawaii.

Along with Paul Cret and others, Goodhue is sometimes credited with being part of popularizing the art deco style in America, as in his design for the Nebraska State Capitol building, by which some may retroactively classify him as an early American Modernist. However, his dedication to the integration of art and architecture was exactly contrary to the spirit of Modernism design, and at least partly accounts for the academic and critical neglect of his work.

A significant archive of Goodhue's correspondence, architectural drawings, and professional papers is held by the Avery Architectural and Fine Arts Library at Columbia University in New York City.

James Perry Wilson, an architect and painter responsible for many of the Natural History dioramas at the American Museum of Natural History, was employed by Bertram Goodhue Associates before transitioning to museum work.

Projects 

 

 All Saints' Church, Ashmont, Massachusetts, 1892
 Church of the Advent (Boston) (1875–1888 by Sturgis & Brigham), Lady Chapel Interior, 1894 (as Cram & Goodhue)
 Public Library, Nashua, New Hampshire, 1902
 Grace Church Chapel, Chicago, Illinois, 1904
 The Chapel and the original campus of the United States Military Academy, West Point, New York, 1906
 El Fureidis in Montecito, California, 1906
 Saint Thomas Church in New York City, 1906
 St. James' Episcopal Church in South Pasadena, 1907
 First Baptist Church, Pittsburgh, Pennsylvania, 1909
 St. John's Episcopal Church in West Hartford, Connecticut, 1909
 Kitchi Gammi Club, Duluth, Minnesota, 1912
 St. Paul's Episcopal Church, Duluth, Minnesota, 1912
 Church of the Intercession, New York, 1913
 St. Bartholomew's Church, New York City, 1913
 Hotel Washington, Colón, Panama, 1913
 Saint Mark's Episcopal Church, Mount Kisco, New York, 1913
 Trinity Episcopal Church, Asheville, North Carolina, 1913
 Ford Hall, Rutgers University, 1914
 Hartley Building, Duluth, Minnesota, 1914
 Virginia Military Institute, Lexington, Virginia, 1914
 Cavour Hartley House, Duluth, Minnesota, 1915
 El Prado Quadrangle, the Fine Arts Gallery and the California Building (now the San Diego Museum of Man), all part of the Panama–California Exposition in Balboa Park, San Diego, California, 1915
 Rockefeller Chapel, University of Chicago, Chicago, Illinois, commissioned 1918, built 1925–1928
 The town plan and several buildings for the "Million Dollar Ghost Town", Tyrone, New Mexico
 Grolier Club Library, New York City, 1917
 St. Vincent Ferrer, New York City, 1920
 Oahu College and Kamehameha Schools, Honolulu, Hawaii, 1915–1920
 First Congregational Church (Montclair, New Jersey)
 Marine Corps Recruit Depot San Diego, San Diego, California, 1921
Sanctuary of St. Mary's-in-Tuxedo Episcopal Church, Tuxedo Park, New York, 1922.
 The American Cathedral of the Holy Trinity, Paris, France, War Memorial and Cloister Wall, 1922-1923.
 Los Angeles Central Library, Downtown Los Angeles, California, 1924
 Nebraska State Capitol, Lincoln, Nebraska, 1924
 National Academy of Sciences Building, Washington, D.C., 1924
 Master Plan, the Physics Building, Dabney Hall, and other campus buildings for the California Institute of Technology (Caltech), Pasadena, California, 1924
 Fraternity House of the Rensselaer Society of Engineers, Troy, New York, 1922–1924
 Trinity English Lutheran Church, West End Historic District, Fort Wayne, Indiana, 1924
 Oriental Institute, University of Chicago, Chicago, Illinois, commissioned 1919, completed in 1931 by the successor firm of Mayers Murray & Phillip.
 Honolulu Museum of Art, Honolulu, Hawaii, commissioned 1922, completed 1927 by Hardie Phillip.
 Christ Church Cranbrook, Bloomfield Hills, Michigan, 1925–1928.
 Memorial Flagpole or Goodhue Flagpole, Pasadena, California, 1927
 Lihiwai (residence of the governor of the Territory of Hawaii), Honolulu, Hawaii, 1927–1929 (completed by Hardie Phillip).
 C. Brewer Building, Honolulu, Hawaii, completed 1931 by Hardie Phillip.
 House of Philip W. Henry, Linden Circle, Briarcliff Manor, New York
 Wolf's Head Society "New Hall", Yale University, New Haven, Connecticut, designed ca. 1924, built posthumously

References 
Notes

Citations

Works cited
 
 

Further reading
 Oliver, Richard. Bertram Grosvenor Goodhue. Cambridge, Massachusetts: MIT Press, 1983 for the Architectural History Foundation. xii + 297 pp.; 146 illustrations, bibliography, index. 
 Whitaker, Charles Harris, ed. With text by Hartley Burr Alexander, Ralph Adams Cram, George Ellery Hale, Lee Lawrie, and C. Howard Walker. Bertram Grosvenor Goodhue: Architect and Master of Many Arts. New York: Press of the American Institute of Architects, Inc., 1925. (Reprint, New York: Da Capo Press, 1976. .)
 Wyllie, Romy. Bertram Goodhue: His Life and Residential Architecture. New York: W. W. Norton & Company, 2007.

External links 

 Bertram Grosvenor Goodhue architectural drawings and papers, 1882–1980. Held by the Department of Drawings & Archives, Avery Architectural & Fine Arts Library, Columbia University.
 Church of St. Vincent Ferrer (New York, N.Y.) architectural drawings, 1908–1928. Held by the Department of Drawings & Archives, Avery Architectural & Fine Arts Library, Columbia University.
 Christ Church Cranbrook, Bloomfield Hills, MI
 Online history of Hotel Washington in Panama
 St. John's Episcopal Church, West Hartford, Connecticut
 Font Designer – Bertram G. Goodhue
 About the National Academy of Sciences Building, Washington, D.C.
 An Alphabet of Celebrities illustrated by Bertram Goodhue, available in full text and with full zoomable page images in the University of Florida Digital Collections
 UNCG American Publishers' Trade Bindings: Bertram Goodhue

 
1869 births
1924 deaths
American neoclassical architects
Art Deco architects
Gothic Revival architects
Historicist architects
Mediterranean Revival architects
Spanish Colonial Revival architects
Spanish Revival architects
American ecclesiastical architects
Architects of cathedrals
Architects from California
Architects from New York City
Fellows of the American Institute of Architects
Balboa Park (San Diego)
19th-century American architects
20th-century American architects
Recipients of the AIA Gold Medal
Members of the American Academy of Arts and Letters